The Winnipeg Tammany Tigers football team was a Canadian football team in Winnipeg, Manitoba that played in the Manitoba Rugby Football Union and Western Canada Rugby Football Union between 1913 and 1929. On May 14, 1930 the Tammany Tigers disbanded due to financial difficulties and a month later was reorganized as a new team: the Winnipegs. The team was part of one of the most successful and popular sports clubs in the city, the Tammany Tigers Athletic Association, which also fielded championship lacrosse, baseball and ice hockey teams.

The Association first fielded a football team in 1910, and had junior and intermediate teams for 3 seasons. Led by popular coach and World War I veteran Leland 'Tote' Mitchell, the team managed to win two MRFU championships and played in the 13th Grey Cup game, losing to the Ottawa Senators 24-1.

While the Tammany Tigers did provide the nucleolus of the new Winnipeg Rugby Football Club, (known simply as the Winnipegs) the team is not part of the official history or records of Winnipeg's current team: the Blue Bombers.

MRFU season-by-season

References

Defunct Canadian football teams
Win
Sports clubs established in 1913
Sports clubs disestablished in 1929
1913 establishments in Manitoba
1929 disestablishments in Canada